Onbe Dam is a gravity dam located in Shimane Prefecture in Japan. The dam is used for flood control and power production. The catchment area of the dam is 102.4 km2. The dam impounds about 104  ha of land when full and can store 16800 thousand cubic meters of water. The construction of the dam was started on 1973 and completed in 1990.

References

Dams in Shimane Prefecture
1990 establishments in Japan